Chao Ming-hsiu (born 9 July 1997) is a Taiwanese footballer who plays as a midfielder for Taipower.

Career

In 2018, Chao after trialed for Japanese side FC Ryukyu. In 2019, he trialed for Cova da Piedade in Portugal.

International goals

References

External links
 

1997 births
Association football midfielders
Chinese Taipei international footballers
Living people
Taiwan Football Premier League players
Taiwan Power Company F.C. players
Taiwanese footballers
Taichung Futuro F.C. players